Leyre may refer to 
Monastery of Leyre in Spain
Eyre (river) in France
Leyre Abadía (born 2000), Spanish synchronised swimmer
Leyre Eizaguirre (born 1980), Spanish diver
Leyre Monente (born 2000), Spanish footballer
Diane Leyre (born 1997), French model and beauty pageant titleholder

See also
Leire (given name)